Roxy Music are an English rock band formed in 1970 by Bryan Ferry—who became the band's lead vocalist and principal songwriter—and bassist Graham Simpson. The other longtime members are Phil Manzanera (guitar), Andy Mackay (saxophone and oboe), and Paul Thompson (drums and percussion) with former members including Brian Eno (synthesizer and "treatments") and Eddie Jobson (synthesizer, keyboards and violin). Although the band took a break from group activities in 1976 and again in 1983, they reunited for a concert tour in 2001, and have toured together intermittently since. Ferry frequently enlisted band members as session musicians for his solo releases.

Roxy Music became a successful act in Europe and Australia during the 1970s. This success began with their first album Roxy Music in 1972. The band pioneered more musically sophisticated elements of glam rock while significantly influencing early English punk music, and provided a model for many new wave acts while innovating elements of electronic composition. The group also conveyed their distinctive brand of visual and musical sophistication with their focus on glamorous fashions. Ferry and co-founding member Eno have had influential solo careers. Eno became one of the most significant British record producers of the late 20th century. Rolling Stone originally ranked Roxy Music No. 98 on their greatest artists list  ("The Immortals – The 100 Greatest Artists of All Time"), but dropped the group from the list when they updated it in 2011.

Roxy Music's final studio album was Avalon (1982), which was certified Platinum in the United States. In 2005, the band began recording what would have become their ninth studio album—and their first album with Eno since 1973 (he wrote two songs for it and also played keyboards). However, Ferry eventually announced that the material from these sessions would instead be released as a Ferry solo studio album, with Eno playing on "a couple of tracks", and that he believed the group would never again produce a record as Roxy Music. The album was released in 2010 as the Ferry solo studio album Olympia. It featured contributions from Eno, Manzanera, and Mackay (amongst many other session players).

In 2011, Roxy Music played a series of 40th-anniversary shows, but went inactive as a performing entity following the concerts. In 2019, the band were inducted into the Rock and Roll Hall of Fame. In 2022, they returned for a tour to mark the 50th anniversary of their first album.

History

Formation and early years (1970–1971)
In November 1970, Bryan Ferry, who had just lost his job teaching ceramics at a girls' school for holding impromptu record-listening sessions, advertised for a keyboardist to collaborate with him and Graham Simpson, a bassist he knew from his Newcastle art-college band, the Gas Board, and with whom he collaborated on his first songs. In early 1970 Ferry had auditioned as lead vocalist for King Crimson, who were seeking a replacement for Greg Lake. While Robert Fripp and Peter Sinfield decided Ferry's voice was unsuitable for King Crimson's material, they were impressed with his talent and helped the fledgling Roxy Music to obtain a recording contract with E.G. Records.

Andy Mackay replied to Ferry's advertisement, not as a keyboardist but a saxophonist and oboist, though he did have a EMS VCS 3 synthesizer. Mackay had already met Brian Eno during university days, as both were interested in avant-garde and electronic music. Although Eno was a non-musician, he could operate a synthesizer and owned a Revox reel-to-reel tape machine, so Mackay convinced him to join the band as a technical adviser. Before long Eno was an official member of the group. Rounding out the original sextet were guitarist Roger Bunn (who had issued the well-regarded solo studio album Piece of Mind earlier in 1970) and drummer Dexter Lloyd, a classically trained timpanist. The group's name was derived from Ferry and Mackay making a list of old cinemas, and Ferry picking Roxy because it had a "resonance", some "faded glamour", and "didn't really mean anything". After learning of an American band with the name Roxy, Ferry changed the name to Roxy Music.

In 1971, Roxy recorded a demo tape of some early compositions. In the spring of that year, Lloyd left the band, and an advertisement was placed in Melody Maker saying "wonder drummer wanted for an avant rock group". Paul Thompson responded to the advertisement and joined the band in June 1971.

Bunn left the group at the end of the summer of 1971, and in October, Roxy advertised in Melody Maker seeking the "Perfect Guitarist". The successful applicant was David O'List, former guitarist with the Nice. Phil Manzanera—soon to become a group member—was one of about twenty other players who also auditioned.  Although he did not initially make the band as a guitarist, the group were impressed enough with Manzanera that he was invited to become Roxy Music's roadie, an offer which he accepted. In December 1971, after a year of writing and rehearsing, Roxy Music began playing live, with their first show at the Friends of the Tate Gallery Christmas show in London.

The band's fortunes were greatly increased by the support of broadcaster John Peel and Melody Maker journalist Richard Williams. Williams became an enthusiastic fan after meeting Ferry and being given a demonstration tape during mid-1971, and wrote the first major article on the band, featured on Melody Maker'''s "Horizons" page in the edition of 7 August 1971. This line-up of Roxy Music (Ferry/Mackay/Eno/Simpson/Thompson/O'List) recorded a BBC session shortly thereafter.

First two studio albums (1972–1973)
In early February 1972, guitarist O'List quit the group abruptly after an altercation with Paul Thompson, which took place at their audition for David Enthoven of E.G. Management. When O'List didn't show up for the next rehearsal, Manzanera was asked to come along, on the pretext of becoming the band's sound mixer. When he arrived he was invited to play guitar and quickly realised that it was an informal audition. Unbeknownst to the rest of the group, Manzanera had learned their entire repertoire and as a result, he was immediately hired as O'List's permanent replacement, joining on 14 February 1972. Manzanera, the son of an English father and a Colombian mother, had spent a considerable amount of time in South America and Cuba as a child, and although he did not have the same art school background as Ferry, Mackay and Eno, he was perhaps the most proficient member of the band, with an interest in a wide variety of music. Manzanera also knew other well-known musicians, such as Pink Floyd's David Gilmour, who was a friend of his older brother, and Soft Machine's Robert Wyatt.

Two weeks after Manzanera joined the band, Roxy Music signed with E.G. Management.
 With this team, E.G. Management financed the recording of the tracks for their debut album, Roxy Music, recorded in March–April 1972 and produced by King Crimson lyricist Peter Sinfield. Both the album and its famous cover artwork by photographer Karl Stoecker were apparently completed before the group signed with Island Records. A&R staffer Tim Clark records that although he argued strongly that Island should contract them, company boss Chris Blackwell at first seemed unimpressed and Clark assumed he was not interested. A few days later however, Clark and Enthoven were standing in the hallway of the Island offices examining cover images for the album when Blackwell walked past, glanced at the artwork and said "Looks great! Have we got them signed yet?" The band signed with Island Records a few days later. The album was released in June to good reviews and became a major success, reaching No. 10 on the UK album chart in September 1972.

During the first half of 1972, bassist Graham Simpson became increasingly withdrawn and uncommunicative, which led to his leaving the band almost immediately after the recording of the debut album. He was replaced by Rik Kenton.

To bring more attention to their studio album, Roxy Music decided to record and release a single. Their debut single was "Virginia Plain", which scored No. 4 in the British charts. The band's eclectic visual image, captured in their debut performance on the BBC's Top of the Pops, became a cornerstone for the glam trend in the UK. The success of the single caused a renewed interest in the album.

Rik Kenton left the band in January 1973 and was replaced by John Porter. Roxy Music's second album, For Your Pleasure, was released in March 1973. It marked the beginning of the band's long, successful collaboration with producer Chris Thomas, who worked on all of the group's classic albums and singles in the 1970s. The album was promoted with the non-album single "Pyjamarama"; no album track was released as a single. At the time Ferry was dating French model Amanda Lear; she was photographed with a black jaguar for the front cover of the album, while Ferry appears on the back cover as a dapper chauffeur standing in front of a limousine.

Stranded, Country Life, Siren, and solo projects (1973–1977)

Soon after the tour to promote For Your Pleasure ended, Brian Eno left Roxy Music amidst increasing differences with Ferry. He was replaced by 18-year-old multi-instrumentalist Eddie Jobson, formerly of progressive rockers Curved Air, who played keyboards and electric violin. Although some fans lamented the loss of the experimental attitude and camp aesthetic that Eno had brought to the band, the classically trained Jobson was an accomplished musician. John Porter also left at this time and for the next few years Roxy would undergo several more changes in bassist, with John Gustafson (ex-Merseybeats and Quatermass), Sal Maida, John Wetton (ex-King Crimson and future U.K. and Asia member) and Rick Wills (future Foreigner member) all passing through the band during this period, with Gustafson playing on all of the next three studio albums.Rolling Stone referred to the albums Stranded (1973) and Country Life (1974) as marking "the zenith of contemporary British art rock". The songs on these albums also cemented Ferry's persona as the epitome of the suave, jaded Euro-sophisticate. Although this persona undoubtedly began as a deliberately ironic device, during the mid-1970s it seemed to merge with Ferry's real life, as the working-class miner's son from the north of England became an international rock star and an icon of male style.

On the first two Roxy albums, all songs were written solely by Bryan Ferry. Beginning with Stranded, Mackay and Manzanera began to co-write some material. Gradually, their songwriting and musicianship became more integrated into the band's sound, although Ferry remained the dominant songwriter; throughout their career, all but one of Roxy's singles were written either wholly or jointly by Ferry (Manzanera, Mackay and Thompson did individually write a few of the band's B-sides). Stranded was released in November 1973, and produced the top-10 single "Street Life".

The fourth album, Country Life, was released in 1974, and was the first Roxy Music album to enter the US Top 40, albeit at No. 37. Country Life was met with widespread critical acclaim, with Rolling Stone referring to it "as if Ferry ran a cabaret for psychotics, featuring chanteurs in a state of shock". Their fifth album, Siren, contained their only US top 40 hit, "Love Is the Drug". (Ferry said the song came to him while kicking the leaves during a walk through Hyde Park.)

After the concert tours in support of Siren in 1976, Roxy Music disbanded. Their live album Viva! was released in August 1976. During this time Ferry released two solo studio albums on which Manzanera and Thompson performed, and Manzanera reunited with Eno on the critically acclaimed one-off 801 Live album.

Final studio albums and hiatus (1978–1983)
Roxy Music reunited during 1978 to record a new studio album, Manifesto, but with a reshuffled line-up. Jobson was reportedly not contacted for the reunion; at the time, Jobson was touring and recording with his own band, U.K., alongside another ex-Roxy member John Wetton. The remaining four members, Ferry, Mackay, Manzanera and Thompson, recorded the album with session players Alan Spenner (ex-the Grease Band) and Gary Tibbs (ex-Vibrators) on bass and Paul Carrack (ex-Ace and future Squeeze member) on keyboards. On the subsequent tour the core band of Ferry, Mackay, Manzanera and Thompson were augmented by Tibbs and keyboardist Dave Skinner. 

Three singles were issued from Manifesto, including the major UK hits "Angel Eyes" (UK No. 4), and "Dance Away" (UK No. 2). Both these tracks are significantly different from the album versions, as "Dance Away" was remixed for single release, and "Angel Eyes" was entirely re-recorded.

After the tour and before the recording of the next album, Flesh + Blood (1980), Thompson broke his thumb in a motorcycle mishap and took a leave from the band. After Ferry, Mackay and Manzanera completed the album with session drummers, Thompson rejoined them, briefly, in the spring of 1980 and made some television appearances as part of the album's early promotion. By the time the Flesh + Blood tour properly began, Thompson had left again due to musical differences with Ferry.

At this point, the band officially became a core trio of Ferry, Mackay and Manzanera, augmented by a variety of musicians over the next few years including Alan Spenner, Gary Tibbs, Paul Carrack, drummer Andy Newmark and guitarist Neil Hubbard. Flesh + Blood (1980) became a huge commercial success in their homeland, as the album went to No. 1 on the UK charts, and spun off three UK hits: "Oh Yeah" (UK No. 5), "Over You" (UK No. 5), and "Same Old Scene" (UK No. 12).

However, the changed cast reflected a distinct change in Roxy's musical style. Gone were the unpredictable elements of the group's sound, giving way to smoother musical arrangements. Rolling Stone panned Manifesto ("Roxy Music has not gone disco. Roxy Music has not particularly gone anywhere else either.") as well as Flesh + Blood ("such a shockingly bad Roxy Music record that it provokes a certain fascination"), while other sources praised the reunion. Melody Maker said, of Manifesto, "...reservations aside, this may be the first such return bout ever attempted with any degree of genuine success: a technical knockout against the odds."

In 1981, Roxy Music recorded the non-album single "Jealous Guy". A cover version of a song written and originally recorded by John Lennon, Roxy Music recorded "Jealous Guy" as a tribute to Lennon after his 1980 murder. The song topped the UK charts for two weeks in March 1981, becoming the band's only No. 1 single.

Later, with more sombre and carefully sculpted soundscapes, the band's eighth—and final—studio album, Avalon (1982), recorded at Chris Blackwell's Compass Point Studios, was a major commercial success and restored the group's critical reputation and contained the successful single "More Than This". The album also included several Roxy Music classics, such as "Avalon", "The Main Thing", "The Space Between", "True to Life", and "To Turn You On". Ferry, Mackay and Manzanera (augmented by several additional players) toured extensively, with the Avalon tour being documented on the live album Heart Still Beating, eventually released in 1990. After the tour ended in May 1983 the band dissolved. For the next eighteen years Ferry, Mackay and Manzanera all devoted themselves full-time to solo careers.

Reunions (2001–2011, 2019, 2022)
Ferry, Manzanera, Mackay and Thompson re-formed in 2001 to celebrate the 30th anniversary of the band, and toured extensively. A festival performance in Portugal and a short tour of the United States followed in 2003. Absent was Brian Eno, who criticised the motives of the band's reunion, saying, "I just don't like the idea. It leaves a bad taste". Later Eno remarked that his comment had been taken out of context. Manzanera and Thompson recorded and toured with Ferry on his eleventh solo studio album Frantic (2002). Eno also contributed to Frantic on the track "I Thought".

During 2002, Image Entertainment, Inc., released the concert DVD Roxy Music Live at the Apollo featuring performances of 20 songs plus interviews and rehearsal footage.

In 2004, Rolling Stone magazine ranked the group No. 98 on its list of the 100 Greatest Artists of All Time.

Roxy Music gave a live performance at the 2005 Isle of Wight Festival on 11 June 2005, their first UK concert since the 2001–2002 world tour. On 2 July 2005, the band played "Jealous Guy", "Do the Strand", and "Love is the Drug" at the Berlin contribution to Live 8; "Do the Strand" is available on the 4-disc DVD collection, and "Love Is the Drug" can be found on the Live 8 Berlin DVD.

In March 2005, it was announced on Phil Manzanera's official site that the band, including Brian Eno, had decided to record an album of new material. The project would mark the first time Eno worked with Roxy Music since 1973's For Your Pleasure. After a number of denials that he would be involved with any Roxy Music reunion, on 19 May 2006 Eno revealed that he had contributed two songs to the new album as well as playing keyboards on other tracks. He did, however, rule out touring with the band. Had the record been released as a Roxy Music album, it would have been the first album since Manifesto on which original drummer Paul Thompson performed.

During early 2006 a classic Roxy track, "The Main Thing", was remixed by Malcolm Green and used as the soundtrack to a pan-European television commercial for the Opel Vectra featuring celebrated football referee Pierluigi Collina. In July that year, the band toured Europe. They concentrated mostly on places they had never visited before, such as Serbia and North Macedonia. Drummer Andy Newmark, who had been one of the many additional musicians Roxy worked with during the 1979–1983 period, performed during the tour, as Thompson withdrew due to health issues, and Oliver Thompson (guitar) made his first appearance with the band.

In a March 2007 interview with the Western Daily Press, Ferry confirmed that the next Roxy album was definitely being made, but would not be vended for another "year and a half", as he had just released and toured behind his twelfth solo studio album, Dylanesque, consisting of Bob Dylan covers. In June 2007, the band hired a Liverpool-based design agency to develop a website supporting their new album. Early in the year, Manzanera revealed that the band were planning to sign a recording contract. In an October 2007 interview, Ferry said the album would include a collaboration with Scissor Sisters.

Over the summer of 2010, Roxy Music headlined various festivals across the world, including Lovebox at London's Victoria Park, Electric Picnic in Stradbally, Co. Laois, Ireland, and Bestival on the Isle of Wight. Owing to illness, Thompson was replaced on three dates of the tour by Andy Newmark, but returned for the Bestival set.

Roxy performed seven dates around the UK in January and February 2011, in a tour billed 'For Your Pleasure', to celebrate the band's 40th anniversary. They toured Australia and New Zealand between February and March for a further eight shows.

In 2012, Virgin released a box set entitled Roxy Music: The Complete Studio Recordings 1972–1982, celebrating 40 years since the release of the band's debut in 1972.

Graham Simpson, Roxy's original bassist, died on 17 April 2012, at his home in Ladbroke Grove, London. 

In a Rolling Stone Magazine interview on 3 November 2014, Manzanera stated that Roxy had been inactive since 2011 and were unlikely to perform together again. Of a new studio album, he told Classic Rock, "We all listened to it and thought, 'We can't do this. It's not going to be any good. Let's just bin it.' And so it's just sitting there on our personal computers. Maybe one day it'll get finished. But there's no point in putting it out if it's not great."

On 29 March 2019, Roxy Music (Bryan Ferry, Andy Mackay, Phil Manzanera, Paul Thompson, Brian Eno and Eddie Jobson) were inducted to the Rock and Roll Hall of Fame; Thompson and Eno were unable to attend the induction, which saw Ferry, Mackay, Manzanera and Jobson perform a six-song set at the Barclays Center in Brooklyn, New York.

Roxy Music reformed in 2022 for a 50th anniversary tour of the United Kingdom and the United States to be held that autumn. Most North American tour dates featured St. Vincent as a supporting act. Nilüfer Yanya was the UK starter act.

Style
The early style and presentation of Roxy Music was influenced by the art school backgrounds of its principal members. Ferry, Mackay and Eno all had studied at prominent UK art colleges during the mid-to-late 1960s, when these institutions were introducing courses that avoided traditional art teaching practice, with its emphasis on painting, and instead focused on more recent developments, most notably pop art, and explored new concepts such as cybernetics. As writer Michael Bracewell notes in his book Roxy: The Band that Invented an Era, Roxy Music was created expressly by Ferry, Mackay and Eno as a means of combining their mutual interests in music, modern art and fashion.

Ferry studied at Newcastle University in the 1960s under renowned pop artist and educator Richard Hamilton, and many of Ferry's university friends, classmates and tutors – e.g. Rita Donagh and Tim Head – became well-known artists in their own right. Eno studied at Winchester School of Art and although his iconoclastic style became apparent early and caused some conflict with the college establishment, it also resulted in him meeting important artists and musicians including Cornelius Cardew and Gavin Bryars. His interest in electronic music also resulted in his first meetings with Andy Mackay, who was studying at Reading University and who had likewise developed a strong interest in avant garde and electronic music.

The three eventually joined forces in London during 1970–71 after meeting through mutual friends and decided to form a rock band.

Roxy Music was initially influenced by other contemporary artists at the time including the Beatles, the Kinks, the Rolling Stones, David Bowie, Elton John, the Animals, Pink Floyd, King Crimson, Jimi Hendrix, the Velvet Underground and the Who, as well as American rock and roll acts and genres such as Elvis Presley and Motown. Ferry stated that Roxy Music's unique sound came as a result of the diverse and eclectic musical backgrounds of the band's members; "I had lots of musical influences, Phil Manzanera had this Latin heritage, being born in South America. Saxophone and oboe player Andy Mackay was classically trained. Eno with his deep interest in experimental music. They were specialists in their field. Paul Thompson brought a lot, with his very powerful, earthy drumming."

Roxy Music was one of the first rock music groups to create and maintain a carefully crafted look and style that included their stage presentation, music videos, album and single cover designs, and promotional materials such as posters, handbills, cards and badges.
They were assisted in this by a group of friends and associates who helped to sculpt the classic Roxy Music 'look', notably fashion designer Antony Price, hair stylist Keith Mainwaring, photographer Karl Stoecker, the group's "PR consultant" Simon Puxley (a former university friend of Mackay's) and Ferry's art school classmate Nicholas De Ville. Well-known critic Lester Bangs went so far as to say that Roxy represented "the triumph of artifice". Ferry later attributed the band's look to his interest in American music and popular culture icons including Marilyn Monroe, Motown and Stax Records artists. He also stated he wanted to create an alternative image to publicity shots of pop and rock groups at the time which would feature artists "in a dreary street, looking rather sullen. Which was the norm."

The band's self-titled debut album, produced by King Crimson's Pete Sinfield, was the first in a series of albums with increasingly sophisticated covers, with art direction by Ferry in collaboration with his friend Nick De Ville. The album artwork imitated the visual style of classic "girlie" and fashion magazines, featuring high-fashion shots of scantily clad models Amanda Lear, Marilyn Cole and Jerry Hall, each of whom had romances with Ferry during the time of their contributions, as well as model Kari-Ann Muller who appears on the cover of the first Roxy studio album but who was not otherwise involved with anyone in the band, and who later married Mick Jagger's brother Chris. The title of the fourth Roxy studio album, Country Life, was intended as a parody of the well-known British rural magazine of the same name, and the visually punning front cover photo featured two models (two German fans, Constanze Karoli—sister of Can's Michael Karoli—and Eveline Grunwald) clad only in semi-transparent lingerie standing against an evergreen hedge. As a result, in many areas of the US the album was sold in an opaque plastic wrapper because retailers refused to display the cover. Later, an alternative cover, featuring just a picture of the forest, was used.

Legacy and influence
In 2005, Tim de Lisle of The Guardian argued that Roxy Music are the second most influential British band after the Beatles. He wrote, "Somehow, in a landscape dominated by Led Zeppelin at one end and the Osmonds at the other, they managed to reach the Top 10 with a heady mixture of futurism, retro rock'n'roll, camp, funny noises, silly outfits, art techniques, film references and oboe solos. And although their popularity has ebbed and flowed, their influence has been strikingly consistent." In 2019, The Economist also described them as "the best British art-rock band since the Beatles", arguing that "among English rock acts of that time, their spirit of adventure and their impact" was "surpassed only" by David Bowie. Bowie himself cited Roxy Music as one of his favourite British groups and in a 1975 television interview described Bryan Ferry as "spearheading some of the best music to come out of England."

Roxy Music's sound and visual style have been described as a significant influence on later genres and subcultures such as electronic music, punk rock, disco, new wave and new romantic. Madness are among the artists that have cited Roxy Music as an influence. They paid tribute to Bryan Ferry in the song "4BF" (the title is a reference to the song "2HB", itself a tribute to Humphrey Bogart from the first Roxy Music studio album). Other artists who have cited or been described as influenced by Roxy Music include Nile Rodgers, Siouxsie and the Banshees, Duran Duran, U2, the Smiths, Spandau Ballet, Radiohead, Scissor Sisters, Talking Heads, Imogen Heap, Goldfrapp, Pulp, Sex Pistols, the Human League, Todd Terje and Franz Ferdinand.

In 1997, bassist John Taylor of Duran Duran produced the tribute album Dream Home Heartaches... Remaking/Remodeling Roxy Music. The compilation features Taylor as well as Dave Gahan (Depeche Mode) and Low Pop Suicide, among others.

Sex Pistols guitarist Steve Jones named his first band the Strand after the Roxy Music song Do the Strand. Jones has also described Roxy Music's style as a strong influence on the later punk craze he would go on to become a part of and cited their first album as one of his all-time favourites.

The electronic band Ladytron took their name from the title of a song from Roxy Music's first album.

The British band Bananarama took their name, in part, from the Roxy Music song "Pyjamarama".

In popular culture
Roxy Music's work has been featured in a number of soundtracks for both film and television. Multiple Roxy Music songs were featured in the soundtrack to the 2006 BBC fantasy-police drama series Life on Mars set in 1970s Manchester.  "Same Old Scene" plays over the closing credits of the 2008 pilot episode for Life on Mars sequel series Ashes to Ashes, during both the opening and end credits of the 1980 film Times Square, and is featured in a party scene in the 2018 film Can You Ever Forgive Me? The track "Love Is the Drug" is featured in 1995 Martin Scorsese film Casino. The track If There Is Something plays a symbolic role in the 2008 drama/coming of age movie Flashbacks of a Fool directed by Baillie Walsh and starring Daniel Craig. In the film, the younger version of Craig's character is also shown dressing up as Bryan Ferry during a flashback scene set in the 1970s. Sofia Coppola's 2003 film Lost in Translation features Bill Murray's character Bob Harris singing an off-key version of "More Than This" in a karaoke club. It was used on a Nissan TV advertisement in 1999. "More Than This" also is danced to by Toni Collette's character in the 2019 mystery film Knives Out and was featured in the Cold War set television show The Americans. The title song "Avalon" of the 1982 studio album of the same name was featured in the 2005 Nick Love film The Business. Guy Ritchie's 2020 black comedy crime film The Gentlemen features "In Every Dream Home a Heartache" during an action sequence.

A remixed and instrumental of "The Main Thing" was used in a 2006 advertisement campaign for the Vauxhall Vectra featuring football referee Pierluigi Collina.

An antagonist character in the Capcom video game Final Fight named Roxy (a female acrobatic fighter) is named after the band, as are other enemy characters in the game that pay homage to someone or something related to music, like her identical partner Poison.

Roxy Music's iconic 24 August 1972 television appearance on the BBC's Top of the Pops, performing their single "Virginia Plain", was affectionately parodied on two occasions on different British TV comedy programs. The first parody was performed by the cast of the sketch comedy series Big Train (Series 1, Episode 6) in 1998; in the show's closing sketch, a dying Mao Zedong (played by Kevin Eldon) appears to expire, but then rises from his deathbed to perform "Virginia Plain" in the style of Bryan Ferry, accompanied by the rest of the  cast members (plus series co-writer Arthur Mathews) dressed as the members of Roxy Music. The second parody was performed by the cast of the comedy quiz show Shooting Stars in 2002 (Series 5, Episode 7), with Vic Reeves as Bryan Ferry, Bob Mortimer as Phil Manzanera, Johnny Vegas as Eno, and Matt Lucas as Paul Thompson.

In the HBO series Westworld's episode "The Riddle of the Sphinx", an experimental robotic copy of James Delos dances to the Roxy Music song "Do the Strand".

"Bitter-Sweet" from Country Life was a re-occurring background theme through the 3rd series of Babylon Berlin with a cameo of Bryan Ferry singing it in a cabaret in episode 10.

In early April 2021, an image of a purported 1971 letter addressed to "Mr B. Ferry" circulated widely on social media. The document appeared to be a rejection note, sent to Ferry by one "Hugh C. Smith", an Artists & Repertoire manager at Polydor Records, in which "Smith"  patronisingly critiqued a demo tape that the group had submitted to the label. According to a 4 April 2021 item in the Treble e-zine, the letter was in fact an April Fools' Day prank which apparently originated from the Twitter account of former Talking Heads and Tom Tom Club drummer Chris Frantz. In May 2021, Tony Barrell, a British writer and Roxy Music fan, announced that he was the author of the letter.

MembersCurrent line-up Bryan Ferry – vocals, keyboards, piano, harmonica, occasional rhythm guitar (1970–1976, 1978–1983, 2001–2011, 2019, 2022–present)
 Andy Mackay – saxophone, oboe, keyboards, backing vocals (1970–1976, 1978–1983, 2001–2011, 2019, 2022–present)
 Paul Thompson – drums (1971–1976, 1978–1979, 2001–2011, 2022–present)
 Phil Manzanera – lead guitar, occasional backing vocals and bass (1972–1976, 1978–1983, 2001–2011, 2019, 2022–present)Former members Brian Eno – synthesizer, "treatments", backing vocals (1970–1973)
 Graham Simpson – bass (1970–1972, died 2012)
 Roger Bunn – guitar (1970–1971)
 Dexter Lloyd – drums (1970–1971)
 David O'List – guitar (1971–1972)
 Rik Kenton – bass (1972–1973)
 John Porter – bass (1973)
 Eddie Jobson – keyboards, synthesizers, electric violin (1973–1976, 2019)
 John Gustafson – bass (1973, 1974, 1975–1976, died 2014)
 Sal Maida – bass (1973–1974)
 John Wetton – bass (1974–1975, died 2017)
 Rick Wills – bass (1976)Additional musicians Alan Spenner – bass (studio 1978–1982 / live 1982–1983, died 1991)
 Paul Carrack – keyboards, backing vocals (studio 1978–1981 / live 1980–1981)
 Gary Tibbs – bass, backing vocals (studio 1978–1981 / live 1979–1981)
 Dave Skinner – keyboards, backing vocals (live 1979)
 Neil Hubbard – guitar (studio 1979–1982 / live 1980–1983)
 Andy Newmark – drums (studio 1979–1982 / live 1980–1983)

Timeline

Lineups

DiscographyStudio albums' Roxy Music (1972)
 For Your Pleasure (1973)
 Stranded (1973)
 Country Life (1974)
 Siren (1975)
 Manifesto (1979)
 Flesh and Blood (1980)
 Avalon (1982)

Citations

General references
 Bracewell, Michael. Roxy Music: Bryan Ferry, Brian Eno, Art, Ideas, and Fashion (Da Capo Press, 2007) 
 Buckley, David. The Thrill of It All: The Story of Bryan Ferry and Roxy Music (André Deutsch, 2004) 
 Rigby, Jonathan. Roxy Music: Both Ends Burning (Reynolds & Hearn, 2005; revised edition 2008) 
 Stump, Paul. Unknown Pleasures: A Cultural Biography of Roxy Music'' (Quartet Books, 1998)

External links

 Official Page
 
 
 [ Billboard.com Roxy Music Discography]

Art pop groups
English art rock groups
English glam rock groups
English new wave musical groups
English progressive rock groups
British soft rock music groups
Musical groups from London
Musical groups from Newcastle upon Tyne
Island Records artists
Reprise Records artists
Polydor Records artists
E.G. Records artists
Atco Records artists
Warner Records artists
Virgin Records artists
Musical groups established in 1970
Musical groups disestablished in 1983
Musical groups reestablished in 2001
Musical groups disestablished in 2011
Musical groups reestablished in 2022
Progressive pop groups
Avant-pop musicians
1970 establishments in England